The Life of Rayful Edmond Vol. 1 The Rise and Fall is a documentary film written and directed by Kirk Fraser. It was released by May 3rd Films on July 12, 2005 in Washington DC.

Cast
 Rayful Edmond as himself 
 Melvin Middleton as himself
 Clarence "Bootney" Green as himself
 Arthur Reynolds as himself 
 Don Scott as himself
 Donald "Goose" Gossage as himself
 Curtis "Curtbone" Chambers as himself
 Don Choo as Royal Brooks
 Erica Terpsta as Alta Rae Zanville
 Clemont Jacob as DEA Agent
 Sean Lorenzo "AP" as himself

Production
In the Fall of 2003, Kirk Fraser began pre-production on the film. Curtis "Curtbone" Chambers joined production as Executive Producer in the Winter of 2004, as a former friend and co-defendant of Rayful Edmond, Curtbone also appears in the film as an insider into the Edmond's drug empire. The 75-minute film intertwine interviews, reenactments and archival news footage from his early days of drug dealing to his arrest, and the trial.

The picture started filming in the fall of 2004 and ended during the winter of 2005 in Washington, DC and Maryland. An official marketing campaign for the film began during the 2004 Howard University homecoming and was continued till its release date.

Reception
The film was sold out within the first two hours from retail stores across the Washington, DC metropolitan area.

References

External links 
 

2005 films
American documentary films
2000s English-language films
2000s American films